The Urup is a river in the North Caucasus. It is a left tributary of the Kuban, which it joins at Armavir.

References

Rivers of Krasnodar Krai
Rivers of Karachay-Cherkessia